Li Tieh-tseng (1906 – January 28, 1990) was a Chinese ambassador.
In 1928, shortly after graduation, he was appointed county magistrate of Nan County but was forced to leave.
Since then he taught at the School of Law at the Wuhan University.
From 1932 to 1936 he was secretary of the embassy in London, the capital of the United Kingdom.
From 1937 to 1942 he was minister next to Reza Shah in Tehran (Iran) with concurrent accreditation in Baghdad (Iraq). 
From  until  he was ambassador in Tehran with concurrent accreditation in Baghdad.
On  he was designated ambassador to Bangkok (Kingdom of Siam) where he was accredited from  till .
In 1949 he was resident adviser to the Chinese mission next to the UN Headquarters in Lake Success, New York.
On 1 October 1949, after the founding of the People's Republic of China he resigned from the Republic of China government diplomat duties, and instead engaged in international politics and international relations research.
His doctoral thesis, from The London School of Economics and Political Science, was on The problems of Tibet in Sino-British relations
From 1964 to 1966 he was professor at Beijing Foreign Affairs College.
In 1967, during the Cultural Revolution, he had disappeared, but he reappeared as a senior researcher.

References

1906 births
1990 deaths
Alumni of University of London Worldwide
Alumni of the University of London
Ambassadors of China to Thailand
Ambassadors of China to Iran